Ruben Bemelmans was the defending champion, but decided not to defend his title.

Malek Jaziri won the title, defeating Stefan Kozlov 6–2, 6–4 in the final.

Seeds

Draw

Finals

Top half

Bottom half

References
Main Draw
Qualifying Draw

Open de Guadeloupe - Singles